Prince Aribert Joseph Alexander of Anhalt (18 June 1866 – 24 December 1933) was regent of Anhalt from September to November 1918 on behalf of his underage nephew Joachim Ernst, Duke of Anhalt. As regent, following the German revolution, he abdicated in the name of his nephew on 12 November 1918, thus ending the rule of the House of Ascania in Anhalt.

Early life
Prince Aribert was born in Wörlitz, Germany. He was the fourth son of Frederick I, Duke of Anhalt, and Princess Antoinette of Saxe-Altenburg. Anhalt was a Sovereign Duchy in the German Empire.

Marriage

On 6 July 1891, he married Princess Marie Louise of Schleswig-Holstein at St. George's Chapel in Windsor Castle. Princess Marie Louise was the daughter of Prince Christian of Schleswig-Holstein and Princess Helena of the United Kingdom, making her a granddaughter of Queen Victoria. The bride's first cousin, the German Emperor Wilhelm II, had been instrumental in arranging the match.

In December 1900, the Duke of Anhalt used his prerogative as reigning Duke to annul the marriage. Princess Marie Louise, on an official visit to Canada at the time, immediately returned to England. According to her memoirs, she regarded her marriage vows as binding, so she never remarried. Her memoirs do, however, indicate rage over her marital experience and an obvious dislike of her former husband.

Though contemporary sources did not directly suggest it was a cause of his marriage dissolution, a number of contemporaries and subsequent historical accounts suggest Aribert was bisexual or homosexual, and some have suggested an indiscretion with a male attendant was the catalyst for the dissolution and that the marriage had never been consummated. However, other sources later suggested he was planning to remarry.

Regent

When his nephew, Joachim Ernst, succeeded his father as Duke of Anhalt on 13 September 1918, Aribert was appointed regent due to the young age of Joachim Ernst. Aribert's brief regency came to an end on 12 November 1918 when he abdicated in the name of his nephew following the German revolution. The duchy subsequently became the Free State of Anhalt.

Later life
Prince Aribert died in Munich aged 67 on 24 December 1933.

Honours
He received the following orders and decorations:

Ancestry

References and notes

External links

1866 births
1933 deaths
Princes of Anhalt
People from Wörlitz
19th-century German LGBT people
20th-century German LGBT people
LGBT royalty
Major generals of Prussia
German people of French descent
Annulled Honorary Knights Grand Cross of the Order of the Bath
Royal reburials
Sons of monarchs